Babworth is a civil parish in the Bassetlaw District of Nottinghamshire, England.  The parish contains 21 listed buildings that are recorded in the National Heritage List for England.  Of these, one is listed at Grade I, the highest of the three grades, one is at Grade II*, the middle grade, and the others are at Grade II, the lowest grade.  The parish contains the villages of Babworth and Ranby, and is otherwise rural.  The listed buildings include three country houses, their lodges and associated structures.  The other listed buildings are a church, houses and cottages, a public house, a canal bridge, a commemorative stone, and a war memorial.


Key

Buildings

References

Citations

Sources

 

Lists of listed buildings in Nottinghamshire